Where Are Their Stories? is a 2007 film directed by Mexican-Canadian filmmaker Nicolás Pereda. The plot is about a young man, Gabino, who travels to Mexico City to save his grandmother's farm from being sold by relatives from the north. In the process, he reunites with his mother, who works as a maid in a middle-class household.

References

External links

Spanish-language Canadian films
2007 films
Mexican drama films
Canadian drama films
Films directed by Nicolás Pereda
2000s Canadian films
2000s Mexican films